Mo Piu (Mơ Piu) is an unclassified Hmongic language spoken in the village of Nậm Tu Thượng, Nậm Xé Township, western Văn Bàn District, Lào Cai Province. It was first documented in 2009 by a team of French linguists as part of the MICA Institute's "Au Co" Project.

Geneviève Caelen-Haumont reported 237 speakers as of 2011. She notes that Mo Piu is highly divergent from neighbouring Hmongic languages in Vietnam.

Ly Van Tu & Vittrant (2014) tentatively classify Mo Piu as a Guiyang Miao dialect.

References

Further reading

External links
 Mơ Piu darta of Geneviève Caelen-Haumont and Jean-Pierre Salmon on the Speech & Language Data Repository (SLDR) website
 http://crdo.up.univ-aix.fr/crdoRAID/preview/000013/Rapport.pdf

Hmongic languages
Languages of Vietnam